Găujani may refer to the following places in Romania:

Găujani, a commune in Giurgiu County
Găujani, a village in the commune Ungheni, Argeș County
Găujani, a village in the commune Boișoara, Vâlcea County
Găujani (river), a river in Vâlcea County